Kai Kung Shan is a mountain which lies within the western part of Sai Kung Peninsula in northeastern Hong Kong. Stage 3 of the MacLehose Trail traverses this mountain.

See also 
 List of mountains, peaks and hills in Hong Kong
 Sai Kung Country Park

References 

Sai Kung District